John Charles "Jack" Collins (5 January 1930 – 6 July 2008) was an Australian rules footballer who represented  in the Victorian Football League (VFL).

Collins was recruited to Footscray in 1950 from the Yarraville Football Club, and, for the next two years, he won the club's best-and-fairest award (later designated the Charles Sutton Medal).

In 1953, Collins fronted the VFL Tribunal twice. In Junen, he was cleared of a striking charge against  captain Ron Clegg, but later in the season he was involved in an incident with 's Frank Tuck. Both players were reported following a fierce fight and were subsequently suspended. Collins' four-week suspension meant he would miss the finals of the 1953 VFL season in which Footscray finished third.

Collins' return to the side in Round 3 the following season could not have happened sooner. The following week, he would kick nine before against . Collins ended the season as the VFL Leading Goalkicker with 84 goals. He was the leading goalkicker, again, in the 1957 VFL season with a total of 74 goals.

After retiring from football after 154 games and 385 goals, Collins served as a players representative, then secretary, and finally president of the club.

Collins was a personal friend of murdered lawyer Keith William Allan, and gave evidence at each of the three trials in the Supreme Court of Victoria in which three persons were charged with Allan's murder.

References

External links

1930 births
2008 deaths
Australian rules footballers from Victoria (Australia)
Place of birth missing
Western Bulldogs players
Western Bulldogs Premiership players
Coleman Medal winners
Yarraville Football Club players
Charles Sutton Medal winners
VFL Leading Goalkicker Medal winners
One-time VFL/AFL Premiership players